Best of Dana Dane is a compilation album released by Dana Dane. It was released on March 26, 2002, on BMG Special Products and was produced by Hurby Luv Bug and the Invincibles. The album only featured songs from Dana Dane's first two albums, Dana Dane with Fame and Dana Dane 4 Ever, leaving his last album Rollin' Wit Dana Dane out because of its different ownership.

Track listing
"Cinderfella Dana Dane"- 5:24 
"Nightmares"- 5:51 
"Keep the Groove"- 3:56 
"This be the Def Beat"- 3:20 
"We Wanna Party"- 3:00 
"Tales from the Dane Side"- 5:16 
"Delancey Street"- 5:26 
"Something Special"- 4:53 
"Bedie Boo"- 2:23 
"What Dirty Minds U Have"- 3:51

References

2002 compilation albums
Dana Dane albums